Gavrilovsky is a rural locality (a khutor) in Isimovsky Selsoviet, Kugarchinsky District, Bashkortostan, Russia. The population was 4 as of 2010. There is 1 street.

Geography 
Gavrilovsky is located 32 km south of Mrakovo (the district's administrative centre) by road. Mukachevo is the nearest rural locality.

References 

Rural localities in Kugarchinsky District